Samuel Animashaun Perry , known professionally as Broda Shaggi , is a Nigerian comedian, actor, songwriter and musician. He is a native of Ishagamu in Ogun State but born in Ikene in Ogun state. At a young age, he took an interest in acting drama as influenced by his late father who was a drama teacher. He is notable for his satirical plays which he shared on Instagram however came through with his parody drama Jesu in Mushin.

Education 
Broda Shaggi is a graduate in creative arts from the University of Lagos. His father was a drama teacher.

Career 
He began performing in comedy acts several years ago while in university. He developed several characters before settling on the name Broda Shaggi. He is noted in the business for his comedy and has unique character. He has won various awards, including The Future Awards Africa Nigeria Prize for Comedy and the City People Music Award for Comedy Act of the Year.

Albums 
 Oya Hit Me Skits, Vol. 1 (2019)

Extended plays 
 Fine Boy Agbero, Vol. 1 (2019) 
 Weekend Vibe (2020)

Singles 
 "Ori" (2019)
 "Bushman" (2019)
 "Shi" (2019)
 "Serere" (2019)
 "Nor Nor" (2019)
 "Wake up" (2019)
 "Black Skin Boy" (2019)
 "Bolanle" (2019)
 "Amarachi"  (2020)
 "Toi Toi" (2019)
 "Star"  (2019)
 "Boredom 101" (2020)
 "Kwarantine" (2020)
 "Okoto"  (2020)
 "Happy Day" (2020)
 "Cross My Lane" feat. Falz (2022)

Filmography 
 Ghetto Bred (2018)
 Aiyetoro Town (2019)
 Fate of Alakada: The Party Planner (2020)
 Namaste Wahala (2020)
Dwindle (2021)
Day Of Destiny (2021)
The Miracle Centre (2020)
Chief Daddy 2: Going for Broke (2022)
King of Thieves (2022)
The New Normal (2020)

Awards and nominations

See also
 List of Nigerian comedians

References

Nigerian male comedians
Year of birth missing (living people)
Yoruba comedians
Yoruba male actors
Nigerian male actors
University of Lagos alumni
Male actors from Lagos
1994 books
Actors from Ogun State
21st-century Nigerian male actors
Nigerian Internet celebrities
People from Ogun State
Nigerian male musicians
Nigerian songwriters